Horde Campaign is an accessory for the Dungeons & Dragons fantasy role-playing game.

Contents
Horde Campaign describes the Horde's assault on the Forgotten Realms, tracking the war battle-by-battle, and providing Battlesystem stats for the battles.

Publication history
Horde Campaign was written by Curtis M. Scott and published by TSR. In its early years, it had a "major impact in TSR's Forgotten Realms setting".

Reception
John Setzer reviewed Horde Campaign in the February 1992 issue of White Wolf Magazine, giving the module generally high marks for presentation. He noted that those running campaigns in the Forgotten Realms, playing the game Battlesystem, or into wargaming would find interest or utility in the module, while others would likely not. Setzer gave the game an overall average rating of 3 out of a possible 5.

References

Forgotten Realms sourcebooks
Role-playing game supplements introduced in 1991